Pete's Dragon is the title of two Disney live-action films:
 Pete's Dragon (1977 film)
 Pete's Dragon (2016 film)